The Woodlawn School is a historic school building located near Mebane, Alamance County, North Carolina. It is based on a design by architects Barrett & Thomson and built in two stages in 1911-12 and 1913. It is a Queen Anne style frame building with a gable roof and belfry. It was originally used as a school and community center and, after 1935, exclusively as a community center. A stage was added to one of the classrooms and the ballfield constructed in 1939, with Works Progress Administration funds.

It was added to the National Register of Historic Places in 1991.

See also
Woodlawn School (Mooresville, North Carolina), a similarly named private school founded in 2002

References

Works Progress Administration in North Carolina
School buildings on the National Register of Historic Places in North Carolina
Queen Anne architecture in North Carolina
School buildings completed in 1913
Buildings and structures in Alamance County, North Carolina
National Register of Historic Places in Alamance County, North Carolina
1913 establishments in North Carolina